Queen Inpyeong of the Ansan Kim clan was a Goryeo royal princess as the first and oldest daughter of King Hyeonjong and Queen Wonseong, also the first younger sister of King Deokjong and King Jeongjong who became a queen consort through her marriage with her half older brother, King Munjong as his first and primary wife. She was the tenth Goryeo queen who took her maternal surname after Queen Gyeongseong, her half-sister.

Family
Father: Hyeonjong of Goryeo
Mother: Queen Wonseong
Older brother: Deokjong of Goryeo
Older brother: Jeongjong of Goryeo
Younger sister: Princess Gyeongsuk (경숙공주)
Husband and half-brother: Munjong of Goryeo – No issue.

References

Eckert, Lee, Lew, Robinson and Wagner, Korea Old and New: A History, Harvard University Press, 1990. 

11th-century births
11th-century deaths
Royal consorts of the Goryeo Dynasty
11th-century Korean women
Goryeo princesses